Languria taedata is a species of lizard beetle in the family Erotylidae. Dark and elongate, it is 9mm to 11mm long. Its larvae grow inside the stems of cordgrass. It is found in North America, especially along the eastern coastal states.

References

Further reading

 

Erotylidae
Articles created by Qbugbot
Beetles described in 1854